Paul H. Anderson (born June 15, 1951) is an American politician serving in the Minnesota House of Representatives since 2009. A member of the Republican Party of Minnesota, Anderson represents District 12A in central Minnesota, which includes the cities of Morris and Benson and portions of Big Stone, Pope, Stearns, Stevens and Swift counties.

Early education and career
Born in Starbuck, Minnesota, Anderson attended Starbuck High School. He graduated from the University of Minnesota, Morris, graduating with a bachelor of arts in physical education and education.

Prior to running for the House, Anderson served as a Pope County commissioner, a member of the Starbuck School Board, and a Starbuck township officer. Anderson is a fourth-generation farmer, and operates a 700-acre farm near Starbuck.

Minnesota House of Representatives
Anderson was elected to the Minnesota House of Representatives in 2008 and has been reelected every two years since. He first ran after three-term Republican incumbent Bud Heidgerken announced he would not seek reelection. 

Anderson serves as the minority lead on the Agriculture Finance and Policy Committee and also sits on the Property Tax Division and the Sustainable Infrastructure Policy Committee. From 2015 to 2018, Anderson served as chair of the Agriculture Policy Committee. From 2011 to 2012, he was vice chair of the Agriculture and Rural Development Committee.

Agriculture 
In 2015 after being named Agriculture Policy chair, Anderson supported scaling back environmental regulations and protections, citing opposition from agricultural businesses. As chair, Anderson was often at odds with Governor Mark Dayton, opposing the administration's additional rules and regulations. In 2017, Dayton vetoed the omnibus agriculture finance bill because of a provision that exempts farmers from stricter pesticide label regulations, and was criticized by House and Senate Republican agriculture chairs. In 2018, Anderson supported efforts to delay a state rule aimed at reducing groundwater contamination by farm fertilizers.

Anderson has advocated for stronger farm safety measures, even stating his openness to expanding regulations on small farms. He authored legislation to give farmers rebates to equip tractors with roll bars to reduce accidents. 

Anderson has called for year-round E15 ethanol access. He has spoken out against foreign tariffs from China on Minnesota agricultural exports like soybeans and pork.

Anderson opposed a provision allowing Minnesota's four largest cities regulate pesticides, and said "it's a solution looking for a problem." He has opposed efforts to increase regulations on pesticides meant to protect pollinators.

Other political positions 
In 2011, Anderson sponsored legislation that would have the state subsidize two-thirds of the cost of a $900 million dollar Minnesota Vikings stadium. Anderson stated openness to supporting Republican Representative Matt Dean's plan to eliminate MinnesotaCare, a public health care program. He introduced legislation that would exempt a zoo in his district from state wildlife law despite their less strict accreditation status.

Electoral history

Personal life 
Anderson lives in Starbuck, Minnesota with his spouse, Faith, and has three children. Former legislator Delbert F. Anderson is his first cousin once removed.

References

External links

 Official House of Representatives website
 Official Campaign website

1951 births
Living people
People from Pope County, Minnesota
University of Minnesota Morris alumni
Farmers from Minnesota
County commissioners in Minnesota
School board members in Minnesota
Republican Party members of the Minnesota House of Representatives
21st-century American politicians